Johan Salila (28 July 1884 – 12 August 1932) was a Finnish wrestler. He was born in Hollola. He competed at the 1912, 1920 and 1924 Summer Olympics. He won a gold medal at the 1921 World Wrestling Championships.

References

External links
 

1854 births
1932 deaths
Olympic wrestlers of Finland
Wrestlers at the 1912 Summer Olympics
Wrestlers at the 1920 Summer Olympics
Wrestlers at the 1924 Summer Olympics
Finnish male sport wrestlers
World Wrestling Championships medalists